The Alps–Mediterranean Euroregion (transnational co-operation structure) was created on 10 July 2007 between three Italian regions (Piedmont, Liguria and Aosta Valley) and two French regions (Rhône-Alpes and Provence-Alpes-Côte d'Azur). It has an area of about 110,460 km2 and more than 17 million inhabitants. The largest Italian cities are Turin and Genoa and the largest French cities are Lyon, Marseille and Nice near Monaco.

Map

External links 

 

Euroregions
Geography of Piedmont
Geography of Liguria
Geography of Aosta Valley
Geography of Auvergne-Rhône-Alpes
Geography of Provence-Alpes-Côte d'Azur